Eftimie was Orthodox bishop of Transylvania from 1571 to 1574, and the Orthodox bishop of Roman from 1574.

Bishop
Eftimie was the hegumen, or head, of the Bistrița Monastery in Moldavia. Stephen Báthory, Voivode of Transylvania, appointed him to be the bishop of the Orthodox Romanians in his realm on 5 October 1571. During the reign of Báthory's Protestant predecessor, sarah eftimieJohn Sigismund Zápolya, a Romanian Calvinist cleric was appointed as bishop of the Transylvanian Romanians, although most Romanians refused to convert to Calvinism. With Eftimie's appointment, the Roman Catholic Báthory restored the Orthodox church hierarchy in Transylvania. Eftimie was ordained bishop by the Serbian patriarch, Makarije, at Peć in April 1572. His jurisdiction included Transylvania proper and Partium. Two years later he left Transylvania for Moldavia where he was made the bishop of Roman.

References

Sources

16th-century Eastern Orthodox bishops 
Bishops of the Romanian Orthodox Church
People from Piatra Neamț
Year of birth unknown
Year of death unknown